Andrea Muzii (born October 13, 1999) is an Italian memory competitor, former speedcuber, who became IAM World Memory Champion in 2019 and IAM World No.1 ranked athlete. He was the first memory athlete to achieve the IAM title of Grandmaster of Memory-Gold.

On September 12, 2021, Muzii accomplished the IAM highest overall score of all-time with 8594, then beating it again in October 2021 with 8858 becoming also the highest-rated of all-time in the IAM Official World Ranking.

Muzii is the second top-ranked Memory League competitor and winner of 5 ML Seasons (8, 9, 10, 11, 16) and 3 ML Opens.

Personal life 
Muzii was born in Rome, Italy, where he still lives and he is currently studying Management and Computer Science in Luiss University. He dropped out of Medical School in the Sapienza University of Rome after the first year.

Muzii declares not to have a natural gift but that he uses techniques such as the method of loci and the major system. In a YouTube video in which he exposes his IQ (125-135 range), saying "it's not that high", he attributes his results mostly to his dedication to training.

Speedcubing and memory sports career 
Muzii's first approach with mental sports was in 2017 when he entered his first speedcubing competition, the Italian open 2017, where he won the best newcomer prize with an average of 13.78. The following year Muzii placed second at the 2018 Italian championship in the 3x3x3 blindfolded with a best time of 36.95 seconds.

In March 2019 he joined his first memory competition, the 2019 Italian memory championship, placing second in the Italian category and third overall.

In the same year he attended other five memory competitions, placing second in the first one, the 2019 German open, and first in all the other contests including the 2019 European Championship and the 2019 IAM World Memory Championship.

In 2020, Muzii did not attend any classical format competition. In his first competition of 2021 he achieved the IAM highest overall score of all-time with 8594 at the MemoryXL 2021 in Waren, Germany. In the same competition he broke two European records and the 5-minute numbers world record with a score of 630 beating the previous 572 held by himself and Munkhshur Narmandakh.

In October 2021 at the French Open 2021 he broke the IAM all-time best score again with 8858.

In January 2022 Muzii placed second in the Memory League World Championship, losing the final against Alex Mullen. In the 2023 Championship, Muzii placed second again.

Results

Victories

Classical format 
 French Open 2022
 Italian Open 2022
 French Open 2021
MemoryXL Open 2021
IAM World memory championship 2019
 European memory championship 2019
 French Open 2019
 MSO memory championship 2019

Memory League 
 2020 Remote ML Championship
 ML season 8
 ML season 9
 ML season 10
 ML season 11
 ML season 16
2021 Asian-Oceanic Open/MSO Memory Championship
2021 African-European Open
2022 African-European Open

Others 
 The third "memory of JIUDUAN" World cup finals

World Records (current) 
 10-minute cards (550)
 30-minute cards (1202)
 Hour Cards (1829)
 5-minute numbers (630)

IAM Best overall score 
8858 (IAM all-time best).

Media appearances, awards and collaborations 
Muzii has been featured in various national and international TV programs, radio and newspaper articles including the talent show Tu si que vales where he won the €30,000 prize.

In February 2020, Muzii was awarded a prize by Sapienza University of Rome with the participation of the President of the Republic Sergio Mattarella for winning the World Memory Championship.

In September 2020 he took part in a collaboration with Red Bull.

In December 2022 he was kicked off from a Las Vegas casino for counting cards at blackjack with the Italian rapper Fedez. The fact was documented in an episode of the podcast "Muschio Selvaggio".

He has an Instagram profile and a Youtube channel where he uploads videos regarding memory techniques, productivity, self development and other passions of him, like lucid dreaming. Together with Alessandro de Concini, a digital entrepreneur, and Vanni de Luca, an italian mnemonist, Muzii has created an online course called "Mnemonica", where these three teach - Alessandro for studying, Vanni for public performances and Muzii for sport competitions - how to use memory techniques.

References 

1999 births
Living people
People from Rome